The Citizens Commission on Human Rights International (CCHR) is a nonprofit organization established in 1969 by the Church of Scientology and psychiatrist Thomas Szasz, headquartered in Los Angeles, California. Its stated mission is to "eradicate abuses committed under the guise of mental health and enact patient and consumer protections." Many critics regard it as a Scientology front group whose purpose is to push the organization's anti-psychiatric agenda.

Efforts for psychiatric reform

The CCHR achieved an early victory in a 1969 Pennsylvania case involving Victor Győry, a Hungarian refugee who had been committed to a psychiatric hospital against his will in April of that year. The police officers committing Győry said he had tried to kill himself. Doctors at Haverford State Hospital, failing to realise that Győry spoke very little English and was trying to address them in Hungarian, judged him "incoherent" and diagnosed him with paranoid schizophrenia. The hospital refused Győry's request for legal representation, and administered drugs and electroshock treatment to him against his will over a three-month period. An aide at the hospital eventually notified the CCHR, who, under an initiative led by Szasz and lawyer John Joseph Matonis, took the case to court and secured Győry's release.

The CCHR continued to lobby for legislative reform on mental health issues such as the keeping of detailed computer records on involuntarily committed patients and their families, and "drug experimentation" without patients' consent. The CCHR would typically request a tour of a psychiatric hospital, issue a public report based on patient testimony and other sources, and then push for legal investigations and reform. Its early focus was on involuntary commitment procedures.

Since then, the group has organized media campaigns against various psychiatrists, psychiatric organizations and pharmaceutical companies, including Eli Lilly, the manufacturer of Prozac. One campaign is said to have caused a major fall in sales of Prozac, causing considerable commercial damage to the company.

The group campaigned against the use of Ritalin for the treatment of attention-deficit hyperactivity disorder, a disorder which the organization dismisses as nonexistent. The campaign was part of the Ritalin class action lawsuits against Novartis (the manufacturer of Ritalin), CHADD, and the American Psychiatric Association (APA); all five lawsuits were dismissed in 2002.

In 2003, the CCHR presented a report with the title "The Silent Death of America's Children" to the New Freedom Commission on Mental Health, with case histories of several dozen under-aged psychiatric patients who had died as a result of psychotropic drug treatment and restraint measures in the 1990s and early 2000s.

In 2004, the CCHR sponsored a bill requiring doctors to provide patients with information about a medication's side effects before prescribing any psychotropic drugs, while also mandating a legal guardian's signature. Opponents of the bill argued that these additional procedures might discriminate against mentally-ill patients while delaying treatment. The bill attracted widespread disagreement from the medical establishment, including the Massachusetts Department of Mental Health, who opposed it on the grounds that it compromised informed consent. The Massachusetts Psychiatric Society also opposed the bill, believing that it would interfere with the doctor-patient relationship.

On 5 October 2006, National Mental Health Screening Day, the CCHR picketed outside of Riverside Community Care in Wakefield, Massachusetts, holding a protest rally against mental health screening. According to journalist Gary Band in the Wakefield Observer, "The protest fell somewhat flat because Riverside has not conducted these screenings since 2001."

According to a report from the National Center for Biotechnology Information the CCHR has uncovered real cases of faulty psychiatric care, which gave them some credibility; conversely, the CCHR has been accused of using pseudo-science  and false information  to disingenuously validate their claims .

Chelmsford Hospital and DST
From 1988 to 1990 the Australian government held the Chelmsford Royal Commission inquiry into Deep Sleep Therapy (DST). For a decade prior, the CCHR had been pushing for an investigation of the Chelmsford Private Hospital in New South Wales, and its head, Dr. Harry Bailey, who had been practising DST from 1963 to 1979.
Honorable Justice John (J. P.) Slattery, Royal Commissioner, is quoted as stating that the CCHR "contributed considerably to advance the cause of the Chelmsford patients in their campaign for an open inquiry into the hospital." The inquiry discovered that deep sleep therapy had killed 24 patients, not counting patients who had killed themselves, and close to a thousand had had brain damage. Of the former patients, 152 received reparations from a fund totaling in excess of 5 million dollars.

Chelmsford Hospital was forced to close in 1990, and two of its psychiatric staff were made to face charges in 1992. Dr. Bailey himself stepped down in 1979 due to the CCHR's protest campaign, and committed suicide by drug overdose in 1985, the night before he was subpoenaed to appear in court. His suicide note read, in part: "Let it be known that the Scientologists and the forces of madness have won."

Documentaries

CCHR have produced a number of documentaries promoting their view of modern psychiatry. These include:
 The Hidden Enemy,
 Making A Killing,
 Prescription for Violence,
 The Marketing of Madness (see chapter below),
 Dead Wrong, and
 Psychiatry: An Industry of Death, which was made to accompany the CCHR's museum of the same name.

The Marketing of Madness: Are We All Insane?
The Marketing of Madness is a documentary which alleges that the mental health industry is an unscientific field driven solely by the profit motive, to the detriment of patients.

One of the interviewees is Claudia Keyworth, an advocate of 'Bio-Energetic medicine' who believes that healing is best accomplished using the "energy field of the human body". On the topic of mental illness, she asserts: "they say you have a chemical imbalance of serotonin and dopamine, but there's never been a study to prove that, ever."

Simplistic "chemical imbalance" explanations for mental disorders have never received empirical support; and most prominent psychiatrists, neuroscientists, and psychologists have not espoused such ill-defined, facile etiological theories. However, this theory has been widely promoted by the press, advertising and professionals so that the majority of the general western public believes in it.

The documentary claims that psychiatrists have convinced the public that normal negative human experiences are mental illnesses. An example used in the movie is the assertion that psychiatrists seek to label typical shyness as a "social anxiety disorder"; however, patients are diagnosed with a social anxiety disorder only at debilitating levels, where there is an "intense fear in social situations". Unlike a shy individual, a person diagnosed with social anxiety disorder is likely to experience symptoms such as nausea, stammering, and panic attacks.

Controversies and criticisms

Rissmiller labels CCHR as a radical antipsychiatry organization. It encourages the arrest and incarceration of psychiatrists for their alleged crimes against humanity because L. Ron Hubbard had written, "There is not one institutional psychiatrist alive who ... could not be arraigned and convicted of extortion, mayhem and murder."

The CCHR is often characterized as a front group for the Church of Scientology, which sponsors the organization. In 1993, the US Internal Revenue Service granted CCHR tax exemption as part of an agreement with the Church of Scientology International and Religious Technology Center (RTC) under which the RTC took responsibility for CCHR's tax liabilities.

The CCHR has been criticized by journalist Andrew Gumbel for "crudeness" and "paranoia" in its criticism of psychiatry.

Two scholars featured in the film Psychiatry: An Industry of Death, Holocaust scholar Michael Berenbaum and bioethics scholar Arthur Caplan, have rejected the attack on psychiatry and psychology. Berenbaum stated that "I have known psychiatrists to be of enormous assistance to people deeply important to me in my life," and Caplan complained that he had been taped without being told what the film was about, and called the producers "smarmy and dishonest."

In 1988, the CCHR claimed that Professor Sir Martin Roth of Newcastle University had used LSD in tests on mental patients in the 1960s. The statements were publicized in the Northern Echo newspaper, which was ordered by an English court to pay "very substantial" libel damages to Roth after the court found that CCHR's claims were "highly defamatory" and "utterly false."

Jan Eastgate, President of the CCHR and winner of the Church of Scientology Freedom Medal, has been implicated in covering up the sexual abuse of an 11-year-old girl in the Australian branch of the church. Eastgate was head of the Australian CCHR at the time and the girl was abused by her Scientologist stepfather between the ages of 8 and 11 years. Eastgate, who denied the allegations, labelling them "egregiously false", was arrested on 30 March 2011 on charges of perverting the course of justice but later released on conditional bail. All charges were dropped against Eastgate after an investigation by the New South Wales Director of Public Prosecution found that there was not enough substantiating evidence.

In the immediate aftermath of the September 11 attacks, CCHR promulgated a conspiracy theory assigning responsibility for the attacks to Ayman al-Zawahiri, alleging that, as Osama bin Laden's personal psychiatrist (although he is actually a surgeon), he was the principal mastermind behind the attacks and had brainwashed bin Laden using pain, drugs and hypnosis.

See also

Controversy surrounding psychiatry
Scientology and psychiatry
Psychiatry: An Industry of Death

References

External links
 

Organizations established in 1969
1969 establishments in the United States
Scientology organizations
Anti-psychiatry
Organizations based in Los Angeles
Scientology and psychiatry
Psychiatry controversies